Hans Petter Buraas (born 20 March 1975 in Bærum) is a Norwegian Alpine skier. He won the slalom gold medal at the 1998 Olympics in Nagano. He has raced 10 seasons in the World Cup (per 2005), and he obtained one victory in a World Cup competition.

World Cup victories

External links 
 
 
 
 

Norwegian male alpine skiers
Olympic alpine skiers of Norway
Olympic gold medalists for Norway
1975 births
Living people
Alpine skiers at the 1998 Winter Olympics
Alpine skiers at the 2006 Winter Olympics
Sportspeople from Bærum
Olympic medalists in alpine skiing
Medalists at the 1998 Winter Olympics